Fabio Tinazzi (born 1 January 1983) is an Italian footballer.

Career
Tinazzi played 134 matches in Serie C with Reggiana, Fermana, Grosseto and Sambenedettese and 3 matches in Serie B with Treviso, before in September 2009 moved to Bulgaria, signing a contract with Botev Plovdiv. He made his competitive debut for Botev on 20 September 2009 against Litex Lovech in the sixth round of the A PFG and joined in January 2010 to Serie D club A.S.D. Sporting Terni.

References

External links
 Career at LaSerieD.com 

1983 births
Living people
Italian footballers
Association football defenders
Botev Plovdiv players
A.C. Perugia Calcio players
First Professional Football League (Bulgaria) players

Association football midfielders